WWE Diva Search (formerly WWE Raw Diva Search) is an American talent competition that was produced and held by World Wrestling Entertainment (WWE). The first winner was Jaime Koeppe, but she did not receive a contract like subsequent winners of the contest. Other winners included Christy Hemme, Ashley Massaro, Layla El, Eve Torres and Eva Marie. In addition to the winners of the yearly contest, WWE has hired several contestants as Divas, the name that WWE gave at the time to the female performers. As of 2021, Maryse Ouellet is the sole remaining female talents signed with WWE to come from the contest. There were many failed attempts at bringing back the competition over the years following the cancellation of the 2008 season, and was at one point going to return in 2019 under the new name Superstar Search, but those plans were scrapped.

2003

The first WWE Diva Search took place in between July 1 and August 24, 2003. However, unlike the later Diva Searches, the first Diva Search winner did not receive a contract. She received a photoshoot for an issue of WWE Magazine. Jaime Koeppe was named the first WWE Diva Search winner largely due to the Yahoo! Groups fan network her promoter, Amelia Wysocki (Then named, DJ Wysocki) managed on her behalf. The four that competed that year in the 1st WWE Diva search were Jamie Koeppe, Terri Mitchell, Paige and Marsha. Fans voted online and WWE made the final decision. The competition was held the night before SummerSlam at Jillian's in Phoenix, Arizona.

2004

Official themes
The 2004 WWE Raw $250,000 Diva Search featured four official theme songs.
 "Open Your Eyes" by Alter Bridge
 "Real Good Girl" by Jim Johnston
 "Time and Time Again" by Chronic Future
 "Walk Idiot Walk" by The Hives

Top 28
Open casting calls were held in Los Angeles, NYC, and Chicago in June and July to narrow the field down from thousands to 28 women. The following 28 finalists were chosen from each of the locations:

Finalists

Notes
In 2004, WWE decided to make an extension of the Diva Search, which included a one-year contract worth $250,000 and was held on Raw. Over 7,000 females applied to be a part of the contest. The final ten contestants were chosen on a casting special aired on Spike TV on July 15, with guest judges Triple H, Randy Orton, Chris Jericho and Edge.

They began airing the weekly Raw Diva Search segments on July 19. Despite reported claims by the company that the contest would be handled in a classy manner, the contest involved prospective divas performing suggestive acts on live television, such as "seducing" a male wrestler. Fans were allowed to vote for the winners, but the outcome of the voting process was questioned by media outlets. The eventual winner of the competition was Christy Hemme, who went on to pose in Playboy and competed at WrestleMania 21 for the WWE Women's Championship where she was accompanied to the ring by Lita, but ended up with Trish Stratus retaining the title.

Finalists (winner Hemme, runner-up Carmella DeCesare, Amy Weber, and Joy Giovanni) took part in a segment titled "Diss the Diva" on August 30, 2004, which was censored at several points due to foul language and obscenities from the contestants when they were asked to taunt one another verbally. Backstage, the four contestants bickered with and disliked each other, as well. Also, during an earlier segment in the competition, Maria Kanellis gave DeCesare the middle finger.

Despite only one winner being crowned in the competition each year, WWE hired a large number of the contestants from past contests and immediately placed them in on-camera in non-wrestling roles. From the 2004 Diva Search, Michelle McCool, Amy Weber, Candice Michelle, Maria Kanellis, and Joy Giovanni all received contracts after losing the contest. Several of the girls were sent to Ohio Valley Wrestling to train.

Candice Michelle would become the first Diva Search contestant to win a championship on the main roster, defeating Melina for the WWE Women's Championship at Vengeance: Night of Champions.

Gia Allemand was a contestant for the Diva Search. It is unknown what season she was in. Allemand died on August 14, 2013 at 29.

2005

Official theme
The 2005 WWE Raw Diva Search featured one official theme song.
 "Be Yourself" by Audioslave

Contestants

Notes
For the 2005 WWE Raw Diva Search, the eight finalists began appearing on Raw on June 27. One contestant was eliminated each week until there were a final three. Contestant Leyla Milani accidentally exposed herself by falling out of her top while attempting to navigate an obstacle course on the July 4 edition of Raw, leading to a "disqualification" in the contest.

Ashley Massaro was declared the winner on August 15 and received $250,000. As in 2004, other contestants were hired by WWE, including Kristal Marshall, Trenesha Biggers (eliminated in the Top 25) and Elisabeth Rouffaer.

Leyla Milani would later appear on Deal or No Deal as a briefcase model.  Alexis Ondrade would later appear on Flavor of Love (season 1) under the nickname "Smiley".  She would later appear in other "Of Love" spinoff shows under the same nickname or her real name "Leilene Ondrade".

Massaro died on May 16, 2019 at the age of 39.

2006

Official themes
The 2006 WWE Raw Diva Search featured three official theme songs.
 "Face Down" by The Red Jumpsuit Apparatus
 "Move Along" by The All-American Rejects
 "Out Here All Night" by Damone

Contestants

Notes
The eight finalists made their first appearance on WWE programming on Raw on July 10. The Diva Search had an awkward beginning on July 10 with an introductory segment on Raw featuring new host Mike Mizanin. During the segment, Mizanin appeared to have forgotten his lines and stammered on for several minutes when trying to explain the voting procedures for the contest. When introducing the contestants, Mizanin mispronounced names and looked uncomfortable in his new role as Diva Search emcee. Each week, the contestants appeared on both Raw and SmackDown!. The final three appeared on a special that aired on August 16, 2006 on the USA Network, where the winner was announced.

Layla El won the 3rd annual Raw Diva Search and was placed on SmackDown! in late 2006. WWE also hired several of the eliminated Diva contestants including Maryse Ouellet, The Bella Twins, Rebecca DiPietro, Brooke Adams, Amy Zidian, and Milena Roucka. The Bella Twins would become the first Diva Search contestants to be inducted into the WWE Hall of Fame as part of the class of 2020

Also former 2006 Diva Search contestant Maryse became the first ever two time WWE Divas Champion and first ever longest reigning WWE Divas Champion at 216 days & a combined reign at 265 days and noticed by WWE at 212 days & 261 combined days during years 2008 & 2010 and former 2006 Diva Search participants Brie Bella & Nikki Bella won the WWE Divas Championship on separate occasions as well years after the 2006 diva search.

2007

Official theme song
The official theme song for the 2007 WWE Diva Search was "Let it Roll" by Velvet Revolver from the band's second studio album, Libertad, which was released on July 3, 2007. At the time of release, Velvet Revolver was an American hard rock supergroup that featured vocalist Scott Weiland, guitarists Slash and Dave Kushner, bassist Duff McKagan and drummer Matt Sorum. "Let it Roll" was only used as the official theme song for the competition and was not used as the official entrance theme song for the winner of the competition. Special thanks to Velvet Revolver

Contestants

Notes
The first competition was on WWE.com on September 10, which was also when the voting started. The winner was announced on the October 29 edition of Raw. Unlike past Diva Searches, this Search was the first to take place exclusively on WWE.com with most of the pre-taped segments TV. Taryn Terrell, Angela Fong and Lena Yada were called up to the roster despite being eliminated.

Taryn Terrell and Angela Fong would find more success in other promotions.  Taryn Terrell competed for Total Nonstop Action, where she held the TNA Knockouts Championship for a record-setting 279 days, which would be later broken by Taya Valkyrie.  Terrell currently wrestles and does commentary for National Wrestling Alliance.  Angela Fong wrestled for Lucha Underground under the ring name "Black Lotus".  She had a singles match against El Dragon Azteca Jr. at Ultima Lucha Dos.

2013

Official theme song 
The 2013 WWE Diva Search featured one official theme song.

 "Top of the World" by CFO$

Contestants 
The Wrestling Observer Newsletter reported in February 2013 that WWE held an un-aired diva search in the Los Angeles area. Among the prospects that participated were future WWE performers Eva Marie, Alexa Bliss, Lana, JoJo, Devin Taylor, and Veronica Lane, with the former winning the contest. Other participants were Maysa Quy, Olivia Karpinski and Sarah Backman who were all models.

Notes 
Former contestant Lana competed against Naomi for the WWE SmackDown Women's Championship at WWE Money in the Bank of 2017 but was not successful.

Also another former contestant by the name of Alexa Bliss became a very successful female wrestling star in the WWE after working for and wrestling in WWE's NXT and attempting to go for the WWE NXT Women's Championship by entering the NXT Women's Championship tournament where Paige was successful at winning the Inaugural version of the NXT Women's title tournament but later on was forced to vacate the NXT Women's title due to being on the main roster and also due to having the WWE Divas Championship after that Alexa entered the second NXT Women's title tournament but afterwards lost to Charlotte after being successful at beating Alicia Fox in the tournament.

Afterwards Alexa went on to face Sasha Banks and Bayley in NXT for the NXT Women's Championship individually in separate matches and on separate occasions but was not successful. Later on in Alexa Bliss career Alexa was called up to the main roster and became a multi-time WWE Women's Champion winning all the WWE SmackDown Women's Championships, WWE Raw Women's Championships, and WWE Women's Tag Team Championships multiple times.

Future
During WrestleMania 31, WWE announced that new shows will air on the WWE Network, including a returning WWE Diva Search, which was expected to premiere in the fall of 2015. There was no additional information given until July 2016, when WWE surveyed fans about potential new WWE Network shows, including a new season of Diva Search under a new name (WWE Superstar Search) due to the fact that the term "Diva" was ultimately phased out that year. In addition, the show would've been hosted by Lita and Trish Stratus.

WWE originally announced on January 25, 2019 that the competition would return as a competition show, similar to NXT Seasons 1-5 re-entitled, WWE Stars in association with Bunim-Murray Productions including casting. But on September 29 that year, Squared Circle Sirens reporter Casey Michael confirmed it was cancelled. At that time, the focus of the WWE Women's Division has shifted from sex appeal to true athleticism not to mention the fact that indie wrestlers, mixed martial artists and other athletes have pretty much replaced the models when it came to hiring women.

Winners

See also 
 TNA Gut Check
 WWE Tough Enough
 Women in WWE
 Mae Young Classic

References

Search
Recurring events established in 2003
2000s American reality television series
2004 American television series debuts
Diva Search
Spike (TV network) original programming
USA Network original programming
UPN original programming
WWE webcasts